Alona Koshevatskiy (born 8 October 1997) is an Israeli female rhythmic gymnast. She's a two-time (2014, 2016) European Group All-Around bronze medalist and the 2015 European Games Group All-Around silver medalist. She retired in 2016, after competing in the 2016 Olympic Games.

Career

Junior
Alona competed as a part of Israeli Junior Group at the 2011 European Championships in Minsk, Belarus with 5 Ropes routine. They won bronze medal in Group All-Around and placed 5th in Apparatus Final. In 2012, she competed as an individual gymnast. She was a part of Israeli Junior Team which placed 7th in Team competition at the 2012 European Championships in Nizhny Novgorod, Russia. She qualified to two Apparatus Finals, where she placed 8th with Clubs and 7th with Ribbon.

Senior
Koshevatskiy won a total of two bronze medals, while serving as the captain of the national squad, at the European Championships (2014 and 2016), and eventually competed alongside her teammates Yuval Filo, Ekaterina Levina, Karina Lykhvar, and Ida Mayrin at the 2016 Summer Olympics in Rio de Janeiro, finishing outside of medals in the Group All-Around Final with a sixth-place score of 34.549. Koshevatskiy was also selected by the Israel Olympic Committee to carry the national flag at the closing ceremony of the 2016 Summer Olympics.

References

External links
 
 
 
 
 
 

1997 births
Living people
Israeli rhythmic gymnasts
Sportspeople from Petah Tikva
Gymnasts at the 2016 Summer Olympics
Olympic gymnasts of Israel
Gymnasts at the 2015 European Games
European Games medalists in gymnastics
European Games silver medalists for Israel
European Games bronze medalists for Israel
Medalists at the Rhythmic Gymnastics World Championships
Medalists at the Rhythmic Gymnastics European Championships